Mortal Geometry is the seventh studio album by Numb, released on August 23, 2019 by Metropolis Records.

Reception

A critic at I Die: You Die credited the band with sounding inventive after over twenty year away from studio, saying "fluid textures of the later-90s material with some of the clarity and structure of their mechanized-rock era proves to be a good formula that sounds like the band without also sounding dated or like a retread."

Track listing

Personnel
Adapted from the Mortal Geometry liner notes.

Numb
 Don Gordon – lead vocals, instruments, production, instruments, production

Additional musicians
 Khuyết Danh – vocals (4)

Production and design
 Giang Nguyen – design
 Tim Oberthier – engineering
 Dee Partdrige – photography
 Andrew Stiff – cover art
 Eric Van Wonterghem – mastering

Release history

References

External links 
 Mortal Geometry at Bandcamp
 

2019 albums
Numb (band) albums
Metropolis Records albums